The Tertiary is a geologic period.

Tertiary (from Latin, meaning 'third' or 'of the third degree/order..') may also refer to:
 Tertiary (chemistry), a term describing bonding patterns in organic chemistry
 In biochemistry, the tertiary structure of a protein is its overall shape, also known as its fold
 Tertiary consumer, in ecology
 Tertiary feathers or tertials, feathers attached to humerus or inner portion of the wings of birds
 Tertiary color, a color made up by mixing one primary color with one secondary color, in a given color space
 Tertiary sector of the economy, or the service sector
 Tertiary education, educational levels following the completion of secondary education such as university or trade school
 Tertiary care, specialized consultative healthcare
 Tertiary, a member of a third order religious group
 Tertiary source, in research
 Tertiary stress, a proposed level of stress in phonetics

See also 
 Ternary (disambiguation)
 Secondary (disambiguation)
 Quaternary (disambiguation)